Lichenopyrenis is a genus of fungi in the family Pleomassariaceae. This is a monotypic genus, containing the single species Lichenopyrenis galligena.

References

Pleosporales
Monotypic Dothideomycetes genera
Taxa named by André Aptroot